Juan Venado Island Natural Reserve is a nature reserve in Nicaragua. It is one of the 78 reserves that are under official protection in the country. The reserve is home to a wide variety of different species including sea turtles, crocodiles and caimans.

External links
Isla Juan Venado

Protected areas of Nicaragua
León Department